Ronald Ernest McMurtry (3 February 1906, Carlton, Melbourne, Australia – 8 August 1993, Sydney, New South Wales, Australia), professionally known as Ron Shand and earlier in his career billed as  Ronnie McMurtry, was an Australian actor and comedian who worked extensively in numerously genres of the  show business industry including, circus, soft shoe, theatre, cabaret, revue vaudeville, radio, television and film. Shand was also a recording artist. 

He started his career in vaudeville in Perth, he was probably best known however for his role in television soap opera Number 96 as Herb Evans.

Biography

Early life
Shand came from a background in show business, particularly of circus performers, that spanned four generations on his mother's side and three generations on his father's side: his grandfather Patrick Montgomery was an Irish-born ringmaster and horse trainer and was married to Annie Gordon, who was half French and half Spanish. 

Born to entertainer parents, his father, Ernest Shand, and mother were circus acrobats, who had met at 19, while performing with the Fitzgeralds' Circus. Ron was given the surname "Shand" by his grandparents who were travelling circus performers and Ron grew up with them in Melbourne.

Career

Circus, vaudeville and theatre
Ron Shand started his career in the circus as a clown, and later performed as a song and dance man in vaudeville, did tent shows and comedy. He appeared in the Tivoli circuit for many years playing in revue and pantomime, before joining the J. C. Williamson theatre company for several seasons in musical comedy. He worked with his first wife Laurel Streeter and dancer Eddie Clifford. Roles with J C Williamson included The Pajama Game, Can-Can, The Sentimental Bloke, and Sail Away produced by Noël Coward. He also appeared in numerous plays with the John Alden Shakespeare company.

Shand was then one of the original members of the John Alden Shakespeare Company that toured all the capital cities of Australia. Shand played in several straight dramatic roles with the company, appearing in such plays as The Man Who Came to Dinner, Arsenic and Old Lace, Love Thy Neighbour and Bell, Book and Candle.

Television

Through the 1960s Shand also acted in several Australian television drama series, including Homicide and in the early 70s Matlock Police, Division 4 and others.

Shand subsequently found his widest audiences in the 1970s on television through his portrayal of hen-pecked Herbert Evans, husband to shrill gossip Dorrie (Pat McDonald), in the phenomenally successful sex-comedy soap opera Number 96. Comedy characters Dorrie and Herb became two of the show's most popular figures and continued in the series its entire 1972–1977 run. After the series ended Shand acted in television dramas The Young Doctors, A Country Practice, Prisoner and G.P. and the acclaimed miniseries Poor Man's Orange.  He was also part of the cast of a 1977 The Benny Hill Show TV special made in Australia, in place of Hill's usual short, bald stooge Jackie Wright.

Personal life
Shand was married to actress and singer Letty Craydon ( Letitia Matilda Graydon; 1899–1965). He appeared with Letty in revues. 

His younger sister, Iris Shand ( Thelma Hilda Shand; 1912-2000), was a soubrette, dancer and actress, as well as a theatre director and stage manager.

Filmography (selected)

Theatre credits (selected) 
Further theatre credits can be found at  AusStage: Ron Shand theatre roles
Ron had roles for numerous theatre companies including with J.C. Williamson and John Alden theatre:
He started on stage in 1934 and had numerous character roles until 1985

Notes

References

External links

1906 births
1993 deaths
Australian male television actors
Australian male stage actors
20th-century Australian male actors